Fertile Myrtle, serial number 45-21787, is a Boeing B-29 Superfortress that served for the United States Army Air Forces, United States Navy, and later NASA.

It is currently in a dismantled state and owned by American aviation enthusiast Kermit Weeks, who currently has it in storage. Although it is not airworthy, it is still registered with the FAA as N29KW.

History

First services and NACA 

This aircraft was delivered to the USAAF in mid-September 1945, and would ultimately not see combat during World War II, the war itself having ended on September 2nd of that year. Around 1947, the plane would be transferred to the US Navy and assigned Bureau Number 84029, conducting long range search operations.

It was later transferred to NACA, being designated NACA 137, and officially named it Fertile Myrtle. It would used as the mothership to launch the D-558-2 Skyrocket, which eventually became the first aircraft to exceed Mach 2 with Test Pilot Scott Cross-field at the controls. She would continue to serve for NACA, and later its successor NASA, until 1959, when both it and the Bell X-1 mothership were retired and sent to the boneyard. However, around 1969, Fertile Myrtle was rescued from facing the cutters torch and would be donated to the American Air Museum in Oakland, California, who kept it in airworthy condition.

Airshow career, films and grounding 
During its operational museum career, Fertile Myrtle would occasionally appear at airshows and make air displays, being one of only two flyable B-29s in the world at the time, with the other being the B-29A FIFI. Her first career of this type was short as it was from 1970 to 1972, due to the high operating cost of the four Wright R-3350 engines, which had ultimately her grounded for five years, however, she had managed to be brought back to airworthy status around 1977.

Around 1979–1980, Walt Disney used the Fertile Myrtle in their feature film The Last flight of Noah's Ark, where she was used for the flying scenes. Along with this, several other airframes from four scrapped B-29 aircraft that were located at the US Navy's China Lake Facilities were used. Two of the scrapped aircraft were used in Hawaii, while the other two were shipped to the Burbank studio for interiors. Extensive modifications were made in order to have a fuselage that could float, and after filming, all the aircraft remains had to be returned to the US Navy.

Fertile Myrtle was also briefly used for the Viacom production of Enola Gay: The Men, the Mission, the Atomic Bomb, with FIFI being used for the bulk of the scenes featuring the titular Superfortress.

The Fertile Myrtle would continue to fly and do Airshow displays until the early 1980s, when it was grounded due to severe corrosion to its wing spars, due to the damp salty air of Oakland taking a toll on her. The aircraft was then sold to Kermit Weeks around 1984, who would regularly display the aircraft. During her new ownership that same year, there was an attempted ferry flight to Stockton for a thorough restoration, and to get her out of the salty air, but it was forced to be aborted after nearly crashing into downtown Oakland on takeoff. This was due to the both the number three engine being lost, and a turret hatch blowing open, which caused a tremendous amount of drag to occur.

Disassembly and Hurricane Andrew 
Due to her somewhat poor condition, the aircraft was disassembled, and Weeks had the nose section put on display in his Museum in Miami, while the rest of the aircraft was put into storage at Aero Trader in Ocotillo Wells, California. However, the nose section was then heavily damaged in 1992 by Hurricane Andrew, which had completely destroyed the Weeks Air Museum, damaging most of the aircraft collection, and was subsequently vandalized before it was able to be retrieved to be restored once again.

Current status 
The nose section has since been restored and completely re-skinned, and is in storage, with it occasionally being put on display at the Fantasy of Flight Museum in Polk City, Florida, along with the remainder of the unrestored fuselage & wings. While the aircraft itself is disassembled, she is still technically a completed airframe, it's just that the rest of the parts are currently in different locations. She also is still registered with the FAA as N29KW, despite not being in the condition to fly, and is one of only three Superfortress's that are registered, the others being FIFI, as N529B and Doc, as N69972.

Kermit Weeks, who has owned Fertile Myrtle since 1984, has stated that restoring the B-29 to flying condition is one of his main goals, though its unknown how or when he would be able to, or if he'd be able to get the money too do so.

References

External links 
http://www.warbirdinformationexchange.org/phpBB3/viewtopic.php?f=3&t=72487

Individual aircraft
Boeing B-29 Superfortress